Iomys is a small genus of rodent in the family Sciuridae. Its two species are:
 Javanese flying squirrel (Iomys horsfieldii)
 Mentawi flying squirrel (Iomys sipora)

References 

 
Rodent genera
Taxa named by Oldfield Thomas
Taxonomy articles created by Polbot